Huang Lixin (born August 1962) is a Chinese politician currently serving as chairwoman of the Zhejiang Provincial Committee of the Chinese People's Political Consultative Conference. Previously she served as chairwoman of the Jiangsu Provincial Committee of the Chinese People's Political Consultative Conference. Huang has been dispatched successively to fill vacancies left by officials accused of corruption: first replacing Mao Xiaoping in Wuxi, then Yang Weize in Nanjing, then Li Yunfeng as executive vice governor. She is the first woman to serve as party chief of Nanjing in history.

Career
Huang was born in Suqian, Jiangsu province. She graduated from the Jiangsu Agricultural College where she studied electromechanical drainage systems. She went on to obtain a graduate degree in Marxist philosophy at Nanjing University. She began working as an office worker at the provincial office for combating droughts. In 1987, she was transferred to the provincial department of water works and began taking on a series of leadership positions, becoming a fully licensed engineer in April 1991. Between 1992 and 1993, she visited poor rural regions to assist on poverty reduction initiatives. By 1996, she became deputy director of the provincial office for combating droughts and floods. In June 1997 she became assistant to the director of the provincial department of water works. In 1998, Huang spent several months taking executive management courses at the Wharton School of Business at the University of Pennsylvania before returning to China.

In May 2000, at age 37, she was named provincial director of water works. In February 2003 Huang was promoted to Vice Governor of Jiangsu. In December 2007 she was named to the provincial Party Standing Committee, joining the top echelons of power in Jiangsu province. She also studied as part of a contingent of high-ranking Chinese officials at the Kennedy School of Government at Harvard University in 2010. In December 2011, Huang was named party chief of Wuxi, one of China's most prosperous cities, after the incumbent Mao Xiaoping was dismissed for corruption. In January 2015, following the investigation and dismissal of then-Nanjing party chief Yang Weize, Huang was named Party Secretary of Nanjing. The party chief position in Nanjing is a sub-provincial-level position with a seat on the provincial Party Standing Committee. In October 2016, she was named Executive Vice Governor of Jiangsu, replacing the disgraced Li Yunfeng – the third time she assumed a position after the incumbent had been dismissed due to corruption.

In July 2017, Huang was named deputy party secretary of Jiangsu province. In January 2018, Huang was named chairwoman of the Jiangsu Provincial Committee of the Chinese People's Political Consultative Conference.

In January 2022, Huang was appointed chairwoman of the Zhejiang Provincial Committee of the Chinese People's Political Consultative Conference.

Huang is an alternate member of the 18th and 19th Central Committees of the Communist Party of China.

References 

Politicians from Suqian
1962 births
Living people
People's Republic of China politicians from Jiangsu
Chinese Communist Party politicians from Jiangsu
Nanjing University alumni
Vice-governors of Jiangsu
21st-century Chinese women politicians
21st-century Chinese politicians
Alternate members of the 19th Central Committee of the Chinese Communist Party
Alternate members of the 18th Central Committee of the Chinese Communist Party